The R733 road, locally known as the Duncannon or New Line, is a regional road in County Wexford, Ireland. It travels from New Ross to Wexford. In November 2019, the road's New Ross junctions were amended for the N25 New Ross Bypass project.

The R733 goes south from New Ross to Arthurstown. From there the road turns east to Wexford via Wellingtonbridge.

References

Regional roads in the Republic of Ireland
Roads in County Wexford